Pedroza is a surname. Notable people with the surname include:

Anthony Pedroza (born 1979), Mexican-American basketball player
Antonio Pedroza (born 1991), English-Mexican footballer
César Octavio Pedroza Gaitán (born 1959), Mexican politician
Engels Pedroza (born 1966), Venezuelan boxer
Enrique Ibarra Pedroza (born 1952), Mexican politician 
Erik Pedroza (born 1994), Mexican footballer
Eusebio Pedroza (1956–2019), Panamanian boxer
Fernando Pedroza, Mexican-American politician
Héctor Pedroza Jiménez (born 1964), Mexican politician
Martin A. Pedroza (born 1965), Panamanian jockey
Paola Pedroza, Mexican television presenter
Rafael Pedroza (born 1955), Panamanian boxer
Reinaldo Muñoz Pedroza (born 1971), Venezuelan politician